Andrew Reddy (18 January 1933 – 6 March 2022) was an Irish boxer. He competed at the 1952 Summer Olympics and the 1960 Summer Olympics. Reddy died in Walkinstown, Dublin on 6 March 2022, at the age of 89.

References

External links
 

1933 births
2022 deaths
Irish male boxers
Olympic boxers of Ireland
Boxers at the 1952 Summer Olympics
Boxers at the 1960 Summer Olympics
Sportspeople from Dublin (city)
Flyweight boxers